Kokoro (こころ) is a Japanese television drama series and the 68th Asadora series, following Manten. It premiered on March 31, 2003 and concluded on September 27, 2003.

Plot

Cast

Suenaga and Asakura family 

 Noriko Nakagoshi as Kokoro Asakura (her maiden name was Suenaga)
 Ran Itō as Misako Suenaga, Kokoro's mother
 Keiko Kishi as Izumi Kiyono, Kokoro's grandmother (also as narrator)
 Akira Terao as Takuro Suenaga, Kokoro's father
 Tōru Nakamura as Yusaku Asakura, Kokoro's husband
 Tomoka Kurokawa as Sachi Asakura, Yusaku and Kanna's daughter
 Ryohei Hirota as Yūta Asakura, Yusaku and Kanna's son
 Kōjirō Kusanagi as Yuri Asakura, Yusaku's father
 Akemi Omori as Haruko Asakura, Yusaku's mother
 Naomi Zaizen as Kanna Fujii, Yusaku's ex-wife

Hotta family 

 Hiroshi Tamaki as Takumi Hotta, a fireworks craftsman
 Takeshi Onishi as Tadashi Hotta, Takumi's brother
 Taisaku Akino as Denzo Hotta, Takumi and Tadashi's father
 Yuka Itaya as Mariko Hotta, Tadashi's wife

Employees at Kiyokawa 

 Hatsuo Yamaya as Tetsuo Tange, an eel chef at Kiyokawa
 Yukiko Shimizu as Yoshie Chino, a Kiyokawa waitress
 Kunikazu Katsumata as Yasuo Seino, a chef at Kiyokawa
 Moro Morooka as Jō Goi, a board chief
 Yoshitora Okamoto as Carlos Tanaka, a Japanese Brazilian employee at Kiyokawa

People in Asakusa 

 Kenichi Nagira as Mantaro Yamamoto, the owner of Yamamoto-ya
 Eiko Koike as Towako Yamamoto, Mantaro's daughter and Kokoro's best friend
 Ryo Kato as Jiro Yamamoto, Mantaro's son and Towako's brother
 Moto Fuyuki as Tetsuo Ōba, the owner of Ōba-yu
 Mika Hada as Kasumi Ōba, Tetsuo's daughter and a heiress of Ōba-yu
 Takahiro Azuma as Katsuo Ōba, Kasumi's husband
 Rumiko Sogawa as Sumiko Ōba, Tetsuo's wife and Kasumi's mother
 Raita Ryu as Ikkoku Nakajima, the owner of Nakajima Fireworks
 Sadao Abe as Gin Nakajima, Ikkoku's son
 Hiroshi Inuzuka as Sadao Yoshikawa, a man who runs the tailor shop
 Papaya Suzuki as Kaoru Ochiai, a doctor and Yusaku's friend
 Yasukiyo Umeno as Isao Fujioka
 Masuyuki Shida as Tsutomu Fujioka, Isao's son
 Miki Matsumoto as Mayumi Sugii, a nurse

People in Yamakoshi village 

 Kazuko Kato as Saori Uesugi, daughter of a fireworks factory manager
 Shinjirō Ehara as Eizō Uesugi, a fireworks factory owner
 Sachiko Sakurai as Yumeko Murakami, Tatsuzo's daughter
 Susumu Kurobe as Tatsuzo Murakami, a carp producer and Yumeko's father
 Sarutoki Minagawa as Mamoru Hoshikawa, Tatsuzo's sub-ordinate

Others 

 Mayuko Takata as Ryōko Tachibana, a single mother and Kokoro's senior
 Nami Ichinohe as Rikako Tamakoshi, Kokoro's colleague
 Kaito Shiono as Kazuhiro Tachibana, Ryōko's son
 Tsutomu Isobe as Kazunari Tamakoshi, Rikako's father
 Rumiko Koyanagi as Koemi Chino, Yoshie's sister

References

External links 

 Official website

Asadora
2003 Japanese television series debuts
2003 Japanese television series endings